Calea Ferată din Moldova (abbreviated as CFM) is the sole railway operator in the Republic of Moldova, responsible for passenger and cargo transportation, as well as railway infrastructure maintenance within the country. The entire network is single track and is not electrified. It borders the Romanian railway network, with a / break-of-gauge in the west, and the Ukrainian one in the east.

Calea Ferată din Moldova (literally "Railway of Moldova" in Romanian) came into existence in 1991 as the successor to the former MŽD, a subdivision of SŽD, the Railway system of the Soviet Union.

History

In 1844, Governor-General of Novorossiya and Bessarabia Count Mikhail Vorontsov has developed a project of a railway, connecting Odesa and Parcani village by the Dniester. Odesa-Kyiv railway company proposed to connect Odesa and Kyiv with a branch to Parcani via Tiraspol. According to the decree of Nikolay I, the construction was sponsored by government funds.

In 1871 a bridge over the Dniester was constructed. On August 28, 1871, the railway linking Tiraspol with Chișinău was officially opened. This date is recognized as the date of establishment of Moldovan Railways. The line, connecting Bessarabia to the Black Sea and the railway network of Ukraine and Russia became the basis for future development.

On June 1, 1875, the line Chișinău-Cornești-Ungheni was opened (the Chișinău-Cornești railway was built between 1871 and 1873) and connection to Romania was established.

In the first months of the war the Tighina-Basarabeasca-Reni-Giurgiulești line was hastily built; it opened in November 1877.
In 1893-1894 the Lipcani-Ocnița-Otaci, Ocnița-Bălți and Bălți-Florești-Rîbnița-Cobasna lines started operation.
During World War I, in 1917, the Bălți-Ungheni section was built, which finally connected the Northern and the Southern lines.

In the early 1920s, as Moldova had united with Romania, the tracks were converted to standard gauge. In the interwar years the Basarabeasca-Cantemir  and Revaca-Căinari lines appeared.

After World War II Moldova became part of the Soviet Union and the rail network reverted to broad gauge. During the Soviet era the Cantemir-Cahul line was built (1971).

In 2004, all property in Transnistria was taken over by the newly formed Transnistrian Railway (PŽD, Pridnyestrovskaja železnaja doroga).

In 2005, the Revaca-Căinari railway was reconstructed (it was destroyed in 1944) to bypass Transnistrian controlled Bender and reconnect the southern lines with the main network. In 2007-2008 the Cahul-Giurgiulești line was constructed.

Rolling stock

Most of the rolling stock used by CFM was manufactured in the USSR and other countries of the Soviet bloc. The most widespread type of traction unit is Soviet-built triple section 3TE10M (sometimes only 1 or 2 sections are used). Their use in Moldova was motivated by steep gradients on some portions of the rail network (especially, in the regions with hilly terrains), where additional power was needed to pull heavy freight trains. Other popular types of locomotives are M62 ("Mashka") and 2TE10L. Sometimes, Czech-built shunters ChME3 are used as traction units for local passenger operations.

The only type of DMU operated by CFM is D1, manufactured by Hungarian Ganz-MAVAG. However, in 2012 it underwent complete modernization (as D1M) at the Electroputere VFU factory in Romania, with most of the parts changed, including the installation of a new engine by Volvo. In addition, the refurbished units were equipped with an air conditioning system, wireless internet access points, and disability access ramps. The cost of the work is 2.2 million euros per unit. Overall, 15 units are expected to be rebuilt at the Remar factory. The first unit became the subject of significant controversy, as it was put into service before the renovation process was completed, in particular, the old gearbox was not changed, which resulted in the malfunctioning of the train. As of May 2013, the rebuilt train, with the optimized gearbox, was operating on the Chișinău-Odesa line.

In November 2018, CFM ordered 12 TE33A locomotives from GE Transportation for delivery in 2020. The locomotives were delivered in July 2020.

Political involvement

CFM personnel largely consist of Russian speakers, Russian being the language used in the process of operation. Notably, CFM chief executive Miron Gagauz, who held the post of the Minister of Transportation, was one of the few members of the Government who did not speak the official language of the country. Historically, CFM has had good relations with the Communist Party of Moldova. In 2009, its employees signed a letter in which they condemned the opposition protests that followed the 2009 parliamentary elections. They described the events as "an attempt to bring chaos into the country and to destroy everything positive that was built by the current government", claimed that "the elections were carried out in conformity with the international norms and national law on elections" and "the victory of the communists is a logical result of their eight-year stay in power", expressed "full support to the elected power", and called for "punishing the responsible". Eventually, after the defeat of the PCRM in the national elections, the management of the enterprise was changed.

Rail links to adjacent countries
Between Moldova and Romania there is a break-of-gauge (Romania employing standard gauge). The most important crossing (including gauge changing equipment) is Ungheni-Iași, another two are Cantemir-Falciu and Giurgiulești-Galați. International passenger trains run to Bucharest, Iași, Kyiv, Odesa, Saint Petersburg, and Moscow.

Gallery

See also
Transport in Moldova

References

External links

Railway companies of Moldova